This article lists events from the year 2023 in The Bahamas.

Incumbents 

 Monarch: Charles III
 Governor-General: Cornelius A. Smith
 Prime Minister: Philip Davis

Events

Deaths 
17 February – George Myers, 83, vice president of Resorts International (1977–1992).

See also 
 List of years in the Bahamas
 COVID-19 pandemic in the Bahamas
 2023 Atlantic hurricane season
 2023 in the Caribbean

References

External links 

 
2020s in the Bahamas
Years of the 21st century in the Bahamas
Bahamas
Bahamas